This is a list of the 27 cantons of the Alpes-Maritimes department, in France, following the French canton reorganisation which came into effect in March 2015:

 Antibes-1
 Antibes-2
 Antibes-3
 Beausoleil
 Cagnes-sur-Mer-1
 Cagnes-sur-Mer-2
 Cannes-1
 Cannes-2
 Le Cannet
 Contes
 Grasse-1
 Grasse-2
 Mandelieu-la-Napoule
 Menton
 Nice-1
 Nice-2
 Nice-3
 Nice-4
 Nice-5
 Nice-6
 Nice-7
 Nice-8
 Nice-9
 Tourrette-Levens
 Valbonne
 Vence
 Villeneuve-Loubet

References